Louise Taylor may refer to:

Louise Taylor (archer) (1870–1966), American archer
Louise Taylor (Hollyoaks), fictional character
Louise Taylor (jurist), Australian jurist
Louise Taylor (singer), an American singer-songwriter.

See also
Myra Louise Taylor